Jack Grisham (born July 22, 1961) is an American rock vocalist, musician, raconteur and political activist from Southern California. He is the vocalist for the punk rock band T.S.O.L. (True Sounds of Liberty), which emerged from the late 1970s Los Angeles hardcore punk rock scene, along with Black Flag, Circle Jerks and Bad Religion. Grisham has also fronted the bands Vicious Circle, the Joykiller, Tender Fury and Cathedral of Tears. He records with T.S.O.L., the Joykiller and the Manic Low.

Biography

Early life 
Jack Grisham was born in Hayward, California, United States, and then moved to Long Beach. Grisham's father, a career military man with 30 years in the Navy and Coast Guard, died in 1984. Grisham's mother was a military housewife. Grisham was one of five children and has an older sister, two older brothers, and a younger sister.

Grisham's older sister was part of the hippie subculture (or as he calls it, "Late 60's protest crap"). As a result, by the time he was six years old, Grisham was reading publications like Fritz the Cat and Zap Comix, and listening to albums by Frank Zappa and the Mothers of Invention, the Beach Boys, the Ventures, etc. Grisham cites the albums We're Only in it for the Money and Let it Bleed as two of his musical influences.

In his early life, Grisham's family moved back to Long Beach, California. Growing up, he was a rebellious youth heavily into surfing, skateboarding, and in his words "causing trouble."

While in high school, he met future T.S.O.L. drummer Todd Barnes through a girlfriend. Grisham and Barnes became friends, and took off with the girlfriend's guitar and amplifier and began playing around with sounds. In the beginning, Grisham claims, "All we did was make a bunch of noise and yell, "Fuck the neighbors" all day."

Adult life
While in his teens, Grisham started experimenting with mood altering substances. Soon he became addicted to drugs and alcohol. He recalled, "I was a nut. I used to think I didn't have a problem because I didn't shoot up and I didn't take acid."

After several minor tangles with the law stemming from his drug and alcohol abuse, Grisham married a 16-year-old girl in Mexico, which he claims got him on the road to sobriety. When asked how he got sober in a 2008 interview, Grisham said, "Actually, I married an underage girl. I wanted her to get clean. I said I would support her. I was like, "Hey, I'll support you so you can get help. I'll go to the meetings too. Then she ended up leaving and I ended up staying."

Grisham has been sober since January 1989. He has two daughters, Anastasia and Georgia, and resides in Huntington Beach, California.

Vicious Circle
In 1978, Grisham began rehearsing as lead vocalist with future Joneses/The Klan/A.K.A. guitarist Steve Houston (a.k.a. Steve Dead) to form Vicious Circle with bassist Laddy Tirrell and future T.S.O.L. drummer Todd Barnes. Vicious Circle quickly got a following within the beach cities and Los Angeles punk rock scene. Vicious Circle was notorious for Ultra-violence at shows in the early days of punk rock. Grisham is later quoted as saying "Whatever the logic, the Vicious Circle was a maniac attractor."
A recording of Vicious Circle was made in 1978 consisting of 2 separate practice tapes and ultimately released in 2013 by TKO Records as an E.P. record of (200) copies on white vinyl with blue spatter.

True Sounds of Liberty (T.S.O.L.)
Childhood friends Grisham and Barnes were joined by Ron Emory and Mike Roche to form T.S.O.L. The original line-up of the band was Grisham on vocals, Ron Emory on guitars, Mike Roche on bass, and Todd Barnes on drums.

T.S.O.L.'s initial line-up gained fans from the hardcore punk, art punk, death punk, deathrock, horror punk, and goth genres. During his time with T.S.O.L., the band was notorious for their controversial, transgressive, and political lyrics. Jack Grisham brought a darker fashion and sound deathrock to the highly political punk rock scene in Southern California, in particular, Long Beach, California painting his face white, dressing in all-black goth clothes and doing photo-shoots in cemetery locations in the dead of night.
The True Sounds Of Liberty were among the first waves of Southern California bands which embarked upon Nationwide tours performing "punk rock" and "death rock" music in 1982 and also 1983  along with contemporaries such as Black Flag and the Circle Jerks which embraced D.I.Y. ethos of the early punk rock scene self-financing their concert tours with little to no outside assistance from the record industry.

The original T.S.O.L. broke up on January 9, 1983, following the infamous S.I.R. Studios "Sunset Strip" Riot at a headlining T.S.O.L. show featuring Redd Kross, Social Distortion, Los Olvidados. The space was filled to capacity with fans and punks alike outside the venue when violence ensued. Grisham walked away from the band and violence, which was reaching unprecedented levels. Ron Emory and Mike Roche enlisted vocalist Joe Wood, Grisham's brother-in-law at the time to fill the void left by his absence and drummer Mitch Dean for departing drummer Todd Barnes. They played music that started as punk rock, but, with each new album changed to blues-inspired (hair metal). They spent several years touring and recording under the name T.S.O.L. After leaving TSOL, Grisham's interests included the use of synthesizers, declaring in a 1984 interview that synthesizers were "a meaningful addition to any group," but "They're just too new. Synthesizers are like punck rock.  Everyone hated punck rock when it first came out. No one wants change."

The original T.S.O.L. reformed in 1989, but Todd Barnes died of a brain aneurysm in 1999. T.S.O.L. has been touring and recording steadily since 1999.

The Joykiller
Grisham and Ron Emory formed The Joykiller in 1995 along with Billy Persons (The Weirdos/Gun Club) on bass, Ronnie King on keyboards, and Chris Lagerborg on drums. The Joykiller released three albums on Epitaph records prior to disbanding in 1998 and had a minor radio hit in the Netherlands with the song "Go-Bang." They later released their Greatest Non-Hits in 2003.

The Manic Low
In the fall of 2011, Grisham launched into another musical endeavor with his band "the Manic Low". Their debut album, Songs For An Up Day, was released on Moonlight Graham Records in June 2012.

Film
Grisham appeared as himself in the movies American Hardcore and the Geza X film Rage: 20 Years of Punk Rock West Coast Style (2001)(he also wrote the title track "Spit Up the Rage"). In the 1984 Penelope Spheeris film Suburbia, he appeared with T.S.O.L. performing "Wash Away" and "Darker My Love." In (2020) Grisham wrote and directed the short film "288," and in (2021) directed the feature length documentary "Ignore Heroes."

Politics
In the early years of T.S.O.L., Grisham was an outspoken anarchist, and his lyrics were often highly critical of the government. Songs such as "Abolish Government/Silent Majority," "Peace Thru Power," and "Property Is Theft" were standard in T.S.O.L.'s song sets. Grisham later changed his anti-government stance, stating, "What I realized about anarchy is that we are not responsible enough to be anarchist. There's no way possible. We're not responsible enough to be that. That's a heavy concept."

Grisham was one of 135 candidates who ran for governor in the 2003 California gubernatorial recall election, receiving 2,200 votes. He ran on a social democratic platform as incumbent Democratic governor Gray Davis was recalled. During his campaign, he stressed health care and education, and supported the teaching in school of religious tolerance. A historic concert event featuring The Adolescents, T.S.O.L., Youth Brigade and more was cast in an effort to raise awareness to the campaign on Sunday, October 5, 2003 at the Henry Fonda theater in Los Angeles, California

Writing
In 2011, Grisham released his first novel An American Demon: A Memoir. In August 2015 Grisham released A Principle of Recovery: An Unconventional Journey Through the Twelve Steps, a book that walks you through the twelve steps of recovery from Grisham's perspective as a long time person in recovery.
In late 2021, Grisham released a noir novel. It is about a character named Arthur which is based on Jack himself, including many characteristics of Jack when he was on his road to sobriety. The back cover blurb of the book states: “When the ghosts of dreams bleed into real life, hard charging Arthur Chance must leave behind his isolation and step into the world of murder, extortion, and double-crossing lovers. Violence and retribution stand heavy in the wings, but will Arthur become lion or lamb?”

Bibliography

Novel 
 An American Demon: A Memoir (2011)
 Code Blue: A Love Story (2014)
  A Principle of Recovery: An Unconventional Journey Through the Twelve Steps (2015)
 I Wish There Were Monsters (2015) 
 The Pulse Of The World (2022)

Discography

Vicious Circle
Vicious Circle EP (TKO) #192. RELEASE: 2013, Originally recorded in 1978.
Vinyl, 12", EP, White Vinyl With Blue Splatter

T.S.O.L.

LPs
 Dance with Me – (1981)
 Beneath the Shadows – (1982)
 Disappear – (2001)
 Divided We Stand – (2003)
 Who's Screwin' Who? – (2005)
 Live from Long Beach – (2007)
 Life, Liberty & the Pursuit of Free Downloads – (2009)
 The Trigger Complex – (2017)

EPs
 T.S.O.L. EP – (1981)
 Weathered Statues – (1982)

Singles
 "Anticop" – (2001)

Compilations
 Thoughts of Yesterday: 1981–1982 – (1988)
 Weathered Statues – (1997)

Bootlegs
 1980 Demo – (1980)

Movie soundtracks
 Suburbia (1984) Soundtrack
 American Hardcore: The History Of American Punk Rock 1980–1986
 Rage: 20 Years of Punk Rock West Coast Style (2001)

Filmography
 Suburbia (1984)  / a Penelope Spheeris film
 American Hardcore: The History Of American Punk Rock 1980–1986
 Rage: 20 Years of Punk Rock West Coast Style (2001)
 Punks not Dead
 Let it Rock
 Live In Hawaii (DVD) – (2004)
 Live In OC (DVD) – (2001)
 The Early Years / T.S.O.L. Live MVD release

The Joykiller
 The Joykiller (1995) on Epitaph Records
 Static (1996) on Epitaph Records
 Three  (1997) on Epitaph Records
 Ready Sexed Go! (2003) on Epitaph Records
 Music for Break-Ups (2015)

Tender Fury
 Tender Fury (Posh Boy) 1988
 Garden of Evil (Triple X) 1990
 If Anger Were Soul, I'd Be James Brown (Triple X) 1991

Cathedral of Tears
 Cathedral of Tears (Enigma) 1984

Jack Grisham/Mike Roche/Ron Emory/Todd Barnes
 Live 1991 (Triple X) 1991

T.S.O.L./Slayer
 Abolish Government EP7 (Sub Pop) 1996

Rob Dukes, lead singer for the metal band Exodus, did background vocals on the Joykiller albums Static and Three.

The Manic Low
Grisham released, with his group the Manic Low, a 17-song album entitled Songs for an Up Day. The record was released on Moonlight Graham Records in June 2012. The album features Grisham's Joykiller partner, Sean Greaves, on guitar and bass, Rob MiLucky from the Devil's Brigade on guitar and Paul Roessler on keyboards.

References

External links
Grisham's personal site
Grisham's 2008 interview with Ro Hurley from ZZZlist.com
Comedian Neil Hamburger's extensive interview with Grisham on Tom Green's website
Jack Grisham for Governor Benefit Show
The Orange County Register  article on Grisham's recall race
 Trouser Press synopsis of TSOL personnel transitions

Anarcho-punk musicians
American male singers
American punk rock singers
1961 births
Living people
Death rock musicians
Dark cabaret musicians
Gothic rock musicians
Horror punk musicians
Songwriters from California
T.S.O.L. members
American social democrats
Millikan High School alumni
People from Hayward, California